"In the Air" is a single from Australian dance music duo TV Rock featuring Rudy.

Track listings
Australian digital EP
 "In the Air" (Axwell Radio Edit) – 3:22
 "In the Air" (Axwell Remix) – 7:04
 "In the Air" (TV Rock & Luke Chable Remix) – 8:56
 "In the Air" – 7:17

UK digital EP
 "In the Air" (Axwell Edit) – 2:34
 "In the Air" (Blame Edit) – 3:35
 "In the Air" (Grum Remix) – 5:21
 "In the Air" (A1 Bassline Mix) – 4:32
 "In the Air" (Tristan D Remix) – 6:46

Official versions
 "In the Air" (A1 Bassline Mix) – 4:32
 "In the Air" (Axwell Remix) - 7:05
 "In the Air" (Axwell Edit) / (Axwell Radio Edit) – 2:34
 "In the Air" (Blame Edit) – 3:35
 "In the Air" (Grum Remix) – 5:21
 "In the Air" (Tristan D Remix) – 6:46

Charts

Weekly charts

Year-end charts

References

2010 songs
2010 singles
Data Records singles